Dharampur is a small town cum Railway Station in  Aligarh to Moradabad Railway line.  It is located in Bulandshahr District of Uttar Pradesh, India. Nearest town Dibai is only 7 km away and Aligarh is 35 km away.

The Railway code of Dharampur Station in "DMPR".

Before India's independence, during the British Raj, Dharampur was an estate (jagir), and it belonged to jagirdars of Lalkhani Muslim Rajput clan.

References

Cities and towns in Bulandshahr district
Zamindari estates